Jay Leon Fitzmartin is an English semi-professional footballer who plays for Atherton Collieries.

Career
Born in Leigh, Fitzmartin played youth football for Ragnarson and Sons and Atherton Town, before joining Bolton Wanderers aged 11. In June 2019, Fitzmartin signed scholarship forms with Bolton. On 3 September 2019, Fitzmartin made his debut for Bolton in a 1–1 EFL Trophy draw against Bradford City. He returned to the U-18 for the 20–21 season. On 21 June 2021 he signed his first professional contract signing until June 2022. On 3 September 2021, he joined Stalybridge Celtic on loan until January 2022. His debut came a day later when he started in a 1–0 defeat in the FA Cup against Colne. On 14 September, he provided all 3 assists in a 3–0 win against Scarborough Athletic. On 25 September, he scored the first goal of his career when he scored the second goal in a 5–2 win against F.C. United of Manchester.

At the end of February 2022 he returned to Stalybridge Celtic on loan until the end of the season, after his previous period with the club was cut short by an injury. He returned to the club in late March after having made four further appearances for the club. On 3 May, Bolton confirmed that he would be released at the end of his contract.

In July 2022, Fitzmartin signed for Atherton Collieries.

Career statistics

References

Living people
Footballers from Leigh, Greater Manchester
Association football midfielders
Association football wingers
English footballers
Bolton Wanderers F.C. players
Stalybridge Celtic F.C. players
2002 births
Northern Premier League players
Atherton Collieries A.F.C. players